Jean Charles Carbone (born 10 April 1979, Marseille, France) is a French-Italian record producer, arranger and composer. Since 1998, he has been working as freelance sound engineer, both in Italy and abroad, and as in-house producer at Teatro delle Voci and Abnegat Records. As a producer and sound engineer, he shares credits with artists including Ronan Chris Murphy, Steve Vai, Richard Ray Farrell, Black Crowes' Chris Robinson, Alan Vega, Jarvis Cocker, Gavin Friday, Caterina Caselli, Marco Pandolfi, Swamp Dogg, Mick Collins, Mark Arm, Stan Ridgway, Jennifer Gentle's Marco Fasolo, Verdena and many others, producing records for Italian television and several international releases.

Awards
In 2002, Carbone received a platinum music recording sales certification for composing, arranging and producing the song "Never Too Late" released by Sugar/Universal, also used in an Italian commercial by TIM.

In 2013, the band C+C=Maxigross received from the Italian Meeting of Independent Record Labels (MEI) the award for "the best Italian independent production of 2013" for the album Ruvain, for which Carbone engineered three tracks.

In 2015, he was nominated for an Australian Music Celtic Award for the album Nitro, by the band SIDH.

Other contributions
In 2004, the song "If" was used by MTV as the theme song for "MTV en Cuba". 

In 2009, he co-produced and co-wrote the song "La lune" released by Scorpio/BMG, which became number 43 in French charts. 

In 2012, he produced Marco Pandolfi's record Close the Bottle When You're Done. 

In 2015 he produced the first album conceived for teaching music and lyrics in Italian schools for RCS, published with the schoolbook Sentieri Sonori, republished by  Mondadori.

From 2016 to 2019 he produced tracks for other Italian schoolbooks published by Loescher-Bonacci Editore and Palumbo Editore.

Discography
Wr=Composition | Arr=Arranging | Eng=Engineering | Mx=Mixing | Mst=Mastering | Rmst=Remastering | Prod=Production | Perf=Performing (*some credits are shared)

Films

References

Other sources

1979 births
Living people
French music arrangers
French male composers
French record producers